Feyyeh-ye Shavardi (also Romanized as Feyyeh-ye Shāvardī) is a village in Salami Rural District, Khanafereh District, Shadegan County, Khuzestan Province, Iran. At the 2006 census, its population was 2,430, in 466 families.

References 

Populated places in Shadegan County